Ofe achara is an Igbo soup made mainly from Achara (Elephant grass) and mgbam (egusi balls). Ofe In the language refers to soup.

Origin 
The soup is from Abia state which is in the South-Eastern part of Nigeria.

Overview 
The beef or smoked fish is boiled with onion and seasoning cubes. Peeled Achara, egusi balls and achi to thicken the soup are added to a pot filled with palm oil. Okazi leaf is added alongside crayfish,salt, grounded pepper and water are added when the oil float on the soup.

Other foods 
Ofe Achara is best served with fufu.

See also 
 Nigeria cuisine
 Arondizuogu
 Oboro (Nigeria)
 Igbo cuisine

References 

Igbo cuisine
Nigerian soups
 Vegetable dishes
 Meat dishes